The Eel River is a  river mostly in the village of Chiltonville in Plymouth, Massachusetts. Its headwaters are springs and small ponds above Russell Millpond. It flows along Plimoth Plantation and Plymouth Beach for about ½ mile before emptying into Plymouth Harbor between the beach and Manters Point.

Crossings
Below is a list of all crossings over the Eel River. The list starts at the headwaters and goes downstream.

Russell Mills Road
Route 3
Sandwich Road
River Street
Plimoth Plantation Highway
Warren Avenue (Route 3A)

Tributaries
Shingle Brook is the only named tributary of the Eel River.

External links
Pilgrim Hall Museum
The Eel River Watershed Study
Town of Plymouth

Rivers of Plymouth County, Massachusetts
Plymouth, Massachusetts
Rivers of Massachusetts